Thermosyntropha is an anaerobic, thermophilic, and heterotrophic bacterial genus from the family of Syntrophomonadaceae.

References

Further reading 
 
 
 

Eubacteriales
Bacteria genera
Thermophiles